"Charlestonette" is a 1925 jazz composition by jazz musician and bandleader Paul Whiteman and Fred Rose. The song was released as a 78 single by Paul Whiteman and His Orchestra.

Background

The composition was published by Leo Feist in New York. Paul Whiteman recorded the song on September 16, 1925 in New York. The song was released as Victor 19785 backed with "Ida-I Do" in 1925 by Paul Whiteman and His Orchestra. Ben Selvin's Dance Orchestra and Bennie Krueger and His Orchestra, as Brunswick 2948, also recorded the song in 1925.

On the original Victor 78 release, Paul Whiteman's name does not appear on the songwriting credit. Only Fred Rose is credited. On the sheet music published by Leo Feist, however, both Whiteman and Rose are credited as the songwriters.

Personnel

Alto Saxophone, Baritone Saxophone – Charles Strickfaden
Alto Saxophone, Bass Clarinet, Clarinet – Chester Hazlett
Alto Saxophone, Clarinet – Hal McLean
Banjo – Mike Pingitore or Pingatore
Clarinet, Tenor Saxophone – E. Lyle Sharpe
Drums – George Marsh 
Leader, Violin – Paul Whiteman
Piano Accordion – Mario Perry
Piano – Harry Perrella
Trombone – Roy Maxon, Wilbur Hall
Trumpet – Frank D. Siegrist, Henry Busse, Ted Bartell
Tuba – John Sperzel
Violin – Charles Gaylord

Sources
 Paul Whiteman: Pioneer of American Music (Volume 1: 1890–1930), Studies in Jazz, No. 43, by Don Rayno, The Scarecrow Press, Inc., 2003.
 Pops: Paul Whiteman, King of Jazz, by Thomas A. DeLong, New Century Publishers, 1983.
 Jazz by Paul Whiteman, J. H. Sears, 1926.
 How To Be A Band Leader by Paul Whiteman and Leslie Lieber, Robert McBride & Company, 1948.

References

1925 songs
American jazz songs
Jazz compositions
Songs written by Fred Rose (songwriter)
Songs with music by Paul Whiteman